Gawnaha railway station (also Gaunaha) is a small railway station on Narkatiaganj–Bhikhna Thori branch line in West Champaran district, Bihar. Its code is GAH. It serves Gawnaha village.

Gawnaha station is located near the Indo-Nepal border.

Gauge conversion 
Presently services are suspended on Narkatiaganj–Bhikhna Thori branch line since 2015, as it is undergoing gauge conversion, from metre to broad gauge. The last section between Gawnaha and Bhikhna Thori (13 km) passes through dense forest and needs a special permit from the Forest Department allowing construction works. As of August 2019, the permit has not been given. According to the Forest Department, Gawnaha – Bhikhna Thori section should be closed and the railway land transferred to them.

See also

References

Railway stations in West Champaran district
Samastipur railway division